Stormont was a federal electoral district represented in the House of Commons of Canada from 1867 to 1882, 1904 to 1917, and 1925 to 1968. It was located in the eastern part of the province of Ontario.

It was created by the British North America Act of 1867 as consisting of Stormont County. It was abolished in 1882 when it was merged with Cornwall riding into Cornwall and Stormont.

It was re-created as a separate riding in 1903, consisting again of Stormont County. It was abolished in 1914 when it was redistributed between Durham and Glengarry and Stormont ridings.

It was re-created as a separate riding again in 1924 consisting again of Stormont County. In 1947, it was redefined to consist of the county of Stormont, including the city of Cornwall.

The electoral district was abolished in 1966 when it was merged into Stormont—Dundas riding.

Members of Parliament

This riding elected the following members of the House of Commons of Canada:

Election results

1867–1882

|- 
  
|Liberal-Conservative
|Samuel Ault
|align="right"| 955 
 
|Unknown
|Sinclair
|align="right"| 363 
|}

|-
  
|Liberal
|Cyril Archibald
|align="right"| 828   
  
|Liberal-Conservative
|Samuel Ault
|align="right"|792   
|}

|-
  
|Liberal
|Cyril Archibald
|align="right"|905 
 
|Unknown
|J. Crysler
|align="right"| 797    
|}

|-
  
|Liberal-Conservative
|Oscar Fulton
|align="right"|1,082 
  
|Liberal
|Cyril Archibald
|align="right"|885   
|}

1904–1917

|-
  
|Conservative
|Robert Abercrombie Pringle 
|align="right"|2,700 
  
|Liberal
|Robert Smith
|align="right"|2,589
|}

|-
  
|Liberal
|Robert Smith
|align="right"| 2,383   
  
|Conservative
|Robert Abercrombie Pringle
|align="right"| 2,033 
 
|Independent
|Ambrose Fitzgerald Mulhern
|align="right"|658 
|}

|-
  
|Conservative
|Duncan Orestes Alguire
|align="right"| 2,539
  
|Liberal
|George Ira Gogo
|align="right"|2,408 
|}

1925–1968

|-
  
|Conservative
|Charles James Hamilton
|align="right"|5,706
  
|Liberal
|George Ira Gogo
|align="right"| 5,394    
|}

|-
  
|Liberal
|Arnold Neilson Smith
|align="right"|6,623    
  
|Conservative
|Charles James Hamilton
|align="right"|6,083 
|}

|-
  
|Conservative
|Frank Thomas Shaver
|align="right"| 7,901 
  
|Liberal
|Arnold Neilson Smith
|align="right"| 7,326    
|}

|-
  
|Liberal
|Lionel Chevrier
|align="right"|9,233   
  
|Conservative
|Frank Thomas Shaver
|align="right"|6,655 

|}

|-
  
|Liberal
|Lionel Chevrier
|align="right"|10,197   

|National Government
|Elzéar Emard
|align="right"|6,202
|}

|-
  
|Liberal
|Lionel Chevrier
|align="right"| 11,702   
  
|Progressive Conservative
|John Allan Phillips 
|align="right"| 6,016 
 
|Co-operative Commonwealth
|John Charles Steer
|align="right"| 991  
|}

|-
  
|Liberal
|Lionel Chevrier
|align="right"| 12,639   
  
|Progressive Conservative
|Frank Thomas Shaver
|align="right"| 6,670
 
|Co-operative Commonwealth
|Alexander Francis Mullin 
|align="right"|  1,283
  
|Union of Electors
|Amour St-Lucien
|align="right"|252    
|}

|-
  
|Liberal
|Lionel Chevrier
|align="right"| 13,503b   
  
|Progressive Conservative
|John Lawrence McDonald
|align="right"|7,244    
|}

|-
  
|Liberal
|Albert Lavigne
|align="right"| 11,441    
  
|Progressive Conservative
|Donald Robert Dick
|align="right"| 11,091    
|}

|-
  
|Liberal
|Albert Lavigne
|align="right"| 12,505
  
|Progressive Conservative
|Grant Campbell 
|align="right"|10,215 

|}

|-
  
|Progressive Conservative
|Grant Campbell
|align="right"| 13,964
  
|Liberal
|Albert Lavigne 
|align="right"| 11,977 

|}

|-
  
|Liberal
|Lucien Lamoureux
|align="right"| 11,363    
  
|Progressive Conservative
|Grant Campbell
|align="right"| 11,293

 
|New Democratic
|Marjorie Ball
|align="right"|946  
|}
Note: 

* Due to the death of the Liberal candidate for the riding of Stormont, the general election scheduled for June 18, 1962, in this riding was postponed until July 16, 1962.

|-
  
|Liberal
|Lucien Lamoureux
|align="right"| 13,285   
  
|Progressive Conservative
|John Alguire
|align="right"| 9,728 

 
|New Democratic
|Bill Kilger
|align="right"| 801 
|}

|-
  
|Liberal
|Lucien Lamoureux
|align="right"|13,530
  
|Progressive Conservative
|Ken Bergeron
|align="right"| 7,458
 
|New Democratic
|John B. Trew
|align="right"| 3,201   
|}

See also 

 List of Canadian federal electoral districts
 Past Canadian electoral districts

External links 

 Website of the Parliament of Canada

Former federal electoral districts of Ontario